Dungen 2 is the vinyl version of Swedish psychedelic rock group Dungen's album Stadsvandringar.

It was released by Subliminal Sounds in 2002 in a limited edition of 500 copies.  The CD version, Stadsvandringar, was released that year on Dolores Recordings and contained some alternate tracks: "Ät Det Som Växer" was replaced by "Stadsvandring Del 2" and "Andra Sidan Sjön".

Track listing

Side one
"Stadsvandringar" ("City Walks") - 3:14
"Har Du Vart’ I Stockholm?" ("Have You Been To Stockholm?") - 3:42
"Solen Stiger Upp" ("The Sun Rises") - 4:06
"Stock Och Sten" ("Wood And Stone") - 3:26
"Sol Och Regn" ("Sun And Rain") - 4:19

Side two
"Fest" ("Party") - 3:37
"Natten Blir Dag" ("The Night Turns Into Day") - 3:06
"Ät Det Som Växer" ("Eat What Grows") - 5:40
"Vem Vaktar Lejonen?" ("Who Guards The Lions?") - 3:39
"Krona" ("Crown") - 4:01

Personnel
 Gustaf Ejstes – vocals, guitars, bass, drums, keyboards, flutes, violin
 Reine Fiske – guitars, bass, percussion
 Henrik Nilsson – bass
 Marko Lohikari – bass
 Fredrik Björling – drums, percussion
 Alex Wiig – sitar, percussion

References

Sources

2002 albums
Dungen albums